Alempois was a small independent landlocked county in ancient Estonia, bordered by Harjumaa, Järvamaa, Nurmekund, Sakala, and Läänemaa. Alempois had an area of approximately 400 hides.

See also 
Livonian Crusade
Monastic state of the Teutonic Knights
Mädara
Rulers of Estonia
Türi
Vahastu
Wittenstein

References

External links 
Kuidas elasid inimesed vanasti, möödunud sajandil ja praegu (Estonian)
Eesti haldusjaotus ja võõrvõimude vaheldumine läbi aegade (Estonian) 

Ancient counties of Estonia